The Patriotic Electoral Coalition (HVK) was a short-lived electoral coalition in Hungary, formed in December 1989 by the Patriotic People's Front (HNF) and twelve other minor left-wing parties and civil movements to jointly contest the 1990 parliamentary election, the first completely free and competitive elections to be held in the country since 1945 after the fall of communism.

During the campaign, incumbent Minister of Justice Kálmán Kulcsár became head of the coalition's national list. Following the failure parliamentary election, the national congress of the Patriotic Electoral Coalition declared its disestablishment on 4 August 1990. Following that some members of the HVK decided to found the Democratic Coalition Party (DKP).

Election results

National Assembly

References

Sources

External links
Mikola és Stumpf a Hazafias Népfront alelnökei lesznek

1989 establishments in Hungary
1990 disestablishments in Hungary
Defunct political party alliances in Hungary